Namma Makkalu (Kannada: ನಮ್ಮ ಮಕ್ಕಳು) is a 1969 Indian Kannada film, directed by R. Nagendra Rao and produced by Harini. The film stars Chandrashekar, K. S. Ashwath, Pandari Bai, KM Jayashree, and Amarnath in the lead roles. The film has musical score by Vijaya Bhaskar.

Cast

K. S. Ashwath
Pandari Bai
Chandrashekar
KM Jayashree
Amarnath
Balakrishna in Guest Appearance
Adavani Lakshmidevi
Kalpana in Guest Appearance
Nagaraj
Rajaram
Saroja
Sarvamangala
R. Nagendra Rao
Ramadevi
Vadiraj
Indrani
Rajashekar
Shivaram in Guest Appearance
Lilitha
Nagesh
B. Jaya
Niyogi
Anuradha
Govinda
N. S. Vaman in Guest Appearance
Rajananda
Bhaskar
Ramakrishnaraju

Awards
The film won Filmfare Award for Best Film – Kannada (1969)

Soundtrack
The music was composed by Vijaya Bhaskar. All the songs were sung by S Janaki which is a landmark

References

External links

1960s Kannada-language films
Films scored by Vijaya Bhaskar